Fisher is an extinct town in Carroll County, in the U.S. state of Missouri.

A post office called Fisher was established in 1896, and remained in operation until 1904. The origin of the name Fisher is uncertain.

References

Ghost towns in Missouri
Former populated places in Carroll County, Missouri